SDJ may mean:
 Democratic Farmers League of Sweden
 Sendai Airport,  Natori, Miyagi, Japan
 Seven Day Jesus, a Christian rock band
 School District of Janesville, Janesville, Wisconsin, United States
 Suundi language, a Bantu language

SdJ may mean:
 Spiel des Jahres, an annual board game design prize